TV 2 Sport HD was the high-definition television sister channel to Danish television channel TV 2 Sport. It was launched on 2 January 2008.

History
With effect from the turn of the year 2010/2011, TV 2 Sport HD became a mirror of TV 2 Sport, after which the content of the two channels was completely identical. The channel was later taken over by Modern Times Group (MTG) and relayed on 7 January 2013 as TV3 Sport 1.

References

External links
 

Defunct television channels in Denmark
Television channels and stations established in 2008
Television channels and stations disestablished in 2013
2008 establishments in Denmark
2013 disestablishments in Denmark
Sports television in Denmark